"The Haunted Thundermans" is a television episode common to both The Thundermans and The Haunted Hathaways:

The Haunted Thundermans (The Thundermans episode), episode 25 of the Nickelodeon TV series The Thundermans
The Haunted Thundermans (The Haunted Hathaways episode), episode 35 of the Nickelodeon TV series The Haunted Hathaways